Datuk Zuraida binti Kamaruddin (Jawi: زريدة بنت قمرالدين; born 14 March 1958) is a Malaysian politician who formerly served as Minister of Plantation Industries and Commodities in the Barisan Nasional (BN) administration under Prime Minister Ismail Sabri Yaakob, Minister of Housing and Local Government twice in the Perikatan Nasional (PN) administration under former Prime Minister Muhyiddin Yassin and Pakatan Harapan (PH) administration under former Prime Minister Mahathir Mohamad. She was Member of Parliament (MP) for Ampang from March 2008 to November 2022.

Zuraida was formerly a member of the People's Justice Party (PKR) from May 2007 to February 2020. She was the Women Chief of PKR from May 2007 to November 2018 and then the vice-president from November 2018 till February 2020 when she resigned from the party in February 2020 to join Malaysian United Indigenous Party (BERSATU) with her key political ally, Deputy President of PKR and Minister of Economic Affairs Azmin Ali and several MPs aligned with Azmin. Zuraida was with BERSATU and was a member of the Supreme Council of BERSATU from February 2020 to May 2022 before her resignation to join Parti Bangsa Malaysia (PBM). She was a member of PBM from June to December 2022.

Non-political career
Zuraida started working in the private sector in 1980 at Frank Small & Associates, Australia. She held the position of Qualitative Study Manager before progressing to Chuo Senko Advertising (Japan) as Marketing Research and Account Planning Manager. In addition, she has worked with American International Assurance (AIA), Saatchi & Saatchi Advertising, AVON (M) Berhad and Flaireborne (M) Sdn Bhd.

In 1998, she became a training and motivational consultant to advise Petronas, Oriflame, Nutrimetics, and Shinetsu in Texas.

Other posts include being a member of the Board of Directors of Maahad Tahfiz Az-Zahra, Adviser of ALQAS Education & Charity Home, GEMMA Humanitarian Relief Advisor and Malaysian Student Association in Yemen. She is also a founder and chairwoman of WIRDA, a Community Service Center that provides counseling and protection to needy groups including single mothers, travelers, converts and teens.

Political career

2008 general election win
Zuraida won her Ampang seat in the 2008 general election representing PKR, defeating her predecessor Rozaidah Talib with a majority of 3,676 votes. She successfully defended the seat in both the 2013 and 2018 general elections with increased majorities.

She also served as the Women's Chief for PKR before being succeeded by Haniza Talha. She was elected to become vice-president of PKR and concurrently served as Women's Chief for Pakatan Harapan until 24 February 2020.

She is also an advisor to the Selangor Women Empowerment Institute (Malay: Institut Wanita Berdaya Selangor, IWB), a Selangor State Government think tank.

Expulsion and departure from PKR

On 24 February 2020, PKR general-secretary Saifuddin Nasution Ismail announced in a press conference that the Minister of Economic Affairs, Azmin Ali who was also the Deputy President, and Zuraida had been expelled from the party for their actions on 23 October 2019 which went against the party's stance regarding the position of the Prime Minister. In reaction to Azmin and Zuraida's expulsion, eight MPs from PKR aligned towards Azmin subsequently left the party to form an "independent bloc". On 28 February 2020, Zuraida along with the rest of the "independent bloc" joined Parti Pribumi Bersatu Malaysia (BERSATU), a component party of Pakatan Harapan until pulling out of the coalition on 24 February.

BERSATU 
On 25 January 2022, BERSATU's Supreme Council met to discuss the issue on the possibility to expel Zuraida from the party due to her alleged involvements in another party, Parti Bangsa Malaysia (PBM), but no actions was taken after the meeting. On 2 February 2022, the Secretary General of PBM Nor Hizwan Ahmad clarified that Zuraida was not a member of PBM.

On 22 March, BERSATU Supreme Council member Muhammad Faiz Na’aman criticised Zuraida on her absence in helping to campaign for BERSATU in the 2022 Johor state election and suggested that this was a subtle betrayal to BERSATU and urged the party to take serious disciplinary actions against Zuraida.

On 26 May, Zuraida announced that she had decided to leave BERSATU for PBM and her pending resignation as Minister of Plantation Industries and Commodities. Following this, she also noted that discussions with the Prime Minister Ismail Sabri Yaakob would be held as soon as possible on the issue of her pending resignation.

On 28 May, Ismail Sabri clarified that Zuraida was still a minister and has yet to officially tender her resignation to him and could still attend Cabinet meetings. Both Ismail Sabri and Zuraida were overseas for duties and Ismail Sabri noted that they would only discuss the issue after returning to Malaysia.

On 29 May, it was reported that Zuraida denied that she was a "problematic" member of BERSATU in her replies to a show-cause letter from BERSATU. She wrote that she spoke with Muhyiddin the idea of forming a new multiracial party to provide added value and be a subsidiary to BERSATU as it would increase support for BERSATU with the background of PBM which commands the support of the grassroots who numbered 400,000 people would definitely benefit BERSATU. Zuraida received the letter on 11 May for repeatedly participating in PBM activities that violated the discipline of the party, and she replied to the letter on 23 May.

On Zuraida's resignation, UMNO secretary-general Ahmad Maslan said her resignation proved that there was a need for the anti-hopping law, "if the law had been enforced, Zuraida would not have left BERSATU” at the open house of former Menteri Besar of Johor Hasni Mohammad.

PN chairman and BERSATU president Muhyiddin Yassin thanked Zuraida for her contributions to BERSATU and informed that her BERSATU membership was automatically nullified after she joined PBM.

Parti Bangsa Malaysia 
After Zuraida's resignation from BERSATU, PBM secretary-general Nor Hizwan Ahmad clarified that her PBM membership application was still being processed and would still have to go through relevant and proper channels.

On 7 June, Zuraida updated that Ismail Sabri had planned for a meeting with her and that it is the Prime Minister's prerogative on the status of her position as Minister of Plantation Industries and Commodities. She clarified her membership to PBM is still pending and should retain her Ampang federal seat.

On 9 June, PBM president Larry Sng announced that Zuraida became an official member and was appointed as the party's president-designate after the agreements of PBM grassroots, political bureau and supreme council to "drive the development and progress of PBM in the future" in a press conference. Sng also expressed its hope for Zuraida to be retained in the Cabinet as the Minister of Plantation Industries and Commodities. In response and contradiction with her intention to resign, Zuraida also added that she was open and keen to finish her term in the position as she "want to serve the nation and people". Sng clarified that the leadership transition from him to Zuraida would "take time" and Zuraida would take the lead in his absence. PBM had given the mandate to Zuraida to lead a delegation if needed to meet leaders of other political parties and coalitions "in terms of admission to any particular political coalition".

On 8 October, PBM announced the appointment of Zuraida as the new party president after a supreme council meeting held on 7 October. However, on 26 October, Sng released a statement saying he is still the legitimate party president according to the Registrar of Societies (RoS) records (later confirmed by the RoS director-general on 30 October) and subsequently suspended party secretary-general Nor Hizwan Ahmad and information chief Zakaria Abdul Hamid (who are reportedly Zuraida's allies) for holding the supreme council meeting to appoint Zuraida as party president without his knowledge and consent. Nor Hizwan dismissed the suspension, claiming that only Zuraida, as the current party president, can suspend him and Zakaria from the party. On 29 October, Sng announced the suspension of Zuraida's party membership and 12 supreme council members, which was also dismissed by deputy president and supreme council member Haniza Talha the following day.

On 2 November, after a meeting between Sng and Zuraida at the RoS' office, PBM released a statement that Sng is recognised as the rightful party president and will sign the party's candidate appointment letters to contest in the 15th general election (GE15) with Zuraida reverting to her previous designation of president-designate. 

Although Zuraida had announced her pending resignation as Minister of Plantation Industries and Commodities in May 2022, the issue was left undecided and not updated after June 2022. Therefore, her pending resignation did not materialise and she remained holding the position as a PBM member. In GE15, Zuraida sought re-election as Ampang MP by contesting for the Ampang seat for the fourth time. She squared off against a total of eight opponents in the election; five candidates from BN, PH, PN, Gerakan Tanah Air (GTA), Heritage Party (WARISAN) and three independents. Zuraida lost the election to PH's Rodziah Ismail, garnering 4th place with only 4.39% of the votes cast.

On 24 December, Sng was reported to have sent show-cause letters to Zuraida and the 12 suspended party members after they have failed to attend a supreme council meeting. After failing to respond to the 26 December deadline, the party's disciplinary committee have decided to sack Zuraida and 10 of the 13 suspended members from the party.

Controversies
On 5 January 2022, Zuraida's spirited defence of palm oil in Malaysia, including her assertion that they were not harming the orangutan population and the primates were more likely to kill humans than the other way round, has gained social media attention.

Zuraida's office has clarified that her controversial comments about human-harming orangutans had been uttered in “jest”.

Election results

Honour
  :
  Knight Commander of the Order of the Territorial Crown (PMW) – Datuk (2021)

See also
Ampang (federal constituency)

Notes

References

Living people
1958 births
People from Singapore
People who lost Singaporean citizenship
Singaporean emigrants to Malaysia
Malaysian people of Malay descent
Malaysian Muslims
Former Malaysian United Indigenous Party politicians
Former People's Justice Party (Malaysia) politicians
Government ministers of Malaysia
Members of the Dewan Rakyat
Women members of the Dewan Rakyat
Women government ministers of Malaysia
Women in Selangor politics
21st-century Malaysian politicians
21st-century Malaysian women politicians